"You Owe Me" is a song recorded by American music production duo The Chainsmokers. It was composed by Alex Pall and Andrew Taggart, with lyrics written by Pall, Taggart, Emily Warren, Chelsea Jade and production handled by Shaun Frank and the duo. The song was released through Disruptor Records and Columbia Records on February 16, 2018, as the second single from the duo's second studio album, Sick Boy.

Background
On February 14, 2018, the Chainsmokers revealed the single's release date and artwork on social media. The artwork features a heart-shaped steak on a plate, surrounded by red vegetables. They posted an audio preview the day after. The song was compared to Twenty One Pilots' change of sound, with the duo having switched their electronic dance music style for "palm-muted, pop-punk guitars and an occasional synth line" and a "radio-friendly" alternative rock sound.

Production
Production of the song was described as consisting of "soft horn" and a repetitive guitar chord. The song is described as a "dark and brutal portrayal of depression and the media's influence on their recent lives."

Music video
The music video, directed by Rory Kramer, features the Chainsmokers as vampires who eat their guests after meticulously cleaning their mansion.

Track listing

Credits and personnel
Credits adapted from Tidal.
 The Chainsmokers – production, record engineering
 Emily Warren – piano
 Shaun Frank – production, mix engineering
 Chris Gehringer – master engineering

Charts

Certifications

Release history

References

2018 singles
2018 songs
The Chainsmokers songs
Songs written by Andrew Taggart
Songs written by Emily Warren
Columbia Records singles
Songs written by Alex Pall
Vampires in music